A forester is a person who practises forestry, the science, art, and profession of managing forests. Foresters engage in a broad range of activities including ecological restoration and management of protected areas. Foresters manage forests to provide a variety of objectives including direct extraction of raw material, outdoor recreation, conservation, hunting and aesthetics. Emerging management practices include managing forestlands for biodiversity, carbon sequestration and air quality.

Many people confuse the role of the forester with that of the logger, but most foresters are concerned not only with the harvest of timber, but also with the sustainable management of forests. The forester Jack C. Westoby remarked that "forestry is concerned not with trees, but with how trees can serve people".

Career

United States

The median salary of foresters in the United States was $53,750, in 2008.  Beginning foresters without bachelor's degrees make considerably less. Those with master's degrees are able to command salaries closer to the average. The Council for Higher Education Accreditation considers the Society of American Foresters as the principal accreditor for academic degree programs in professional forestry, both at a Bachelor's and Master's level.

Usually a bachelor's degree is considered the minimum education required, but some individuals are able to secure a job without a college education based on their experience.  Some states have a licensing requirement for foresters, and most of those require at least a four-year degree.

Foresters are often employed by private industry, federal and state land management agencies, or private consulting firms.

Medieval foresters

Forester was a title used widely during Medieval times. The forester usually held a position equal to a sheriff or local law enforcer, and he could act as a barrister or arbiter. He was often based in a forester's lodge, and was responsible for patrolling the woodlands on a lord or noble's property, hence the synonymous term 'woodward'. His duties included negotiating sales of lumber and timber and stopping poachers from illegally hunting. Frequently outlaws would take refuge in heavily wooded regions. When this occurred it was the duty of the forester to organize armed posses to capture or disperse the criminals and during war time foresters were used as scouts to spy on enemy troop movement.
The pay and status of foresters was usually above average, reflecting the responsibility of their role in a medieval environment and economy.

Notable foresters

Margaret Stoughton Abell (1908–2004) - First American research forester in US Forest Service.
Dietrich Brandis (1824–1907)
 Ralph E. Brock (1881–1959), first Black forester in the United States
 John Ednie Brown (1848–1899)
Aimo Cajander (1879–1943) - Professor of forestry and Director-General of Forest and Park Service in Finland.
Carl von Carlowitz (1645–1714) - Father of sustainable yield forestry
Geoffrey Chaucer (1343–1400)
Hugh Francis Cleghorn (1820–1895)
Jean-Baptiste Colbert (1619–1683)
John Evelyn (1620–1706)
Bernhard Fernow (1851–1923)
Douglas Hamilton (1820–1895)
Georg Ludwig Hartig (1764–1837)
Ralph Hosmer (1874–1963)
Jens Hvass
Norman Jolly (1882–1954)
Charles Lane Poole (1885–1970)
Aldo Leopold (1887–1948)
Michel de Montaigne (1533–1592) ["Man of essays and wood"]
John Muir (1838–1914) ["Father of  National Parks"]
Herman von Nördlinger (1818–1897) 
Gifford Pinchot (1865–1946)
Christian Ditlev Frederik Reventlow (1748–1827)
Roy Robinson, 1st Baron Robinson (1883–1952)
Viktor Schauberger (1885–1958)
Carl A. Schenck (1868–1955)
Sir William P.D. Schlich (1840–1925)
F.X. Schumacher (1892–1967)
Richard St. Barbe Baker (1889–1982) Global Forester/Environmentalist 
Israel af Ström (1778–1856)
Michael Taylor (b. 1966) - American Forester who discovered Hyperion (tree) and many tall redwood trees.
T. B. Walker (1840–1928)
 Jack C. Westoby (1913–1988)
 Peter Wohlleben - German forester.
Raphael Zon (1874–1956)
Frank H. Wadsworth (1915–2022)

See also

Arborist
List of forest research institutes
List of forestry universities and colleges
Reeve (England)
Society of American Foresters
Institute of Chartered Foresters
Verderer

References

External links

SAF Accredited Professional Forestry Degree Programs
SAF Recognized Forest Technology Degree Programs
Center for International Forestry Research
International Union of Forest Research Organizations
FAO Forestry Department
The National Forest (England)
Forestry Commission (Great Britain)

Foresters
History of forestry